Kamensky District is the name of several administrative and municipal districts in Russia.  The name is generally derived from or is related to the root "kamen" ("stone")—a common toponymic feature.

Kamensky District, Altai Krai, an administrative and municipal district of Altai Krai
Kamensky District, Penza Oblast, an administrative and municipal district of Penza Oblast
Kamensky District, Rostov Oblast, an administrative and municipal district of Rostov Oblast
Kamensky District, Sverdlovsk Oblast, an administrative district of Sverdlovsk Oblast
Kamensky District, Tula Oblast, an administrative and municipal district of Tula Oblast
Kamensky District, Voronezh Oblast, an administrative and municipal district of Voronezh Oblast

See also
Kamensky (disambiguation)
Kamensky Okrug (disambiguation)
Kamensk

References